Panathukkaga is a 1974 Indian Tamil-language film produced and directed by M. S. Senthil. It stars Sivakumar. Jayachitra, Sripriya, Shasikumar, Kamal Haasan and Thengai Srinivasan play supporting roles. It was a remake of the director's own Malayalam film Police Ariyaruthe (1973). Kamal Haasan worked under Thangappan as his dance assistant in this movie.

Cast 
 Sivakumar as Ramesh
 Jayachitra as Chitra
 Shasikumar as Inspector Sundar (Chitra's elder brother)
 Thengai Srinivasan as Kannan (friend of Ramesh & Sundar)
 Sripriya as Geetha
 Master Sridhar as Ravi (Geetha's lover)
 C.I.D. Sakunthala as Kokila (Geetha's stepmother)
 Kamal Haasan as Kumar (Guest Appearance)
 S. V. Ramadas as Masilamani
 Ennatha Kannaiya

Soundtrack 
The music was composed by M. S. Viswanathan, with lyrics written by Kannadasan.

References

External links 
 

1970s Tamil-language films
1974 films
Films scored by M. S. Viswanathan